iMakr operates two of the largest physical locations for 3D printing in both London and New York,

History

Founding
 Founded in London in 2012, iMakr has grown and expanded its reach worldwide, establishing offices in the UK, France, the US and Denmark, supported by a global e-shop, bringing additive manufacturing closer to you and your businesses. iMakr is now recognised as a world leading distributor of best-in-class 3D technologies, including 3D printing and scanning, and advanced consumables, for a diverse range of industries and applications. iMakr's global presence has provided us with the opportunity to work with companies, educational institutions, and individuals across the globe, and become a trusted supplier to valued customers in more than 70 countries.

Opening Of The New York Office and Showroom 
Following the success of their first flagship store in the heart of London, iMakr expanded into the United States, opening their New York based office in 2014. Now located in the heart of Brooklyn, the NY office is home to training, demos, and workshops.

The Digical Show 
On September 30, 2016, the company will host the first ever Digical Show - an event that aims to explore the blurred lines between the physical and 3D printing and 3D scanning worlds. The event will bring together the latest technologies and advancements in 3D printing and 3D scanning and allow experts and 3D printing enthusiasts alike to learn more.

References

Retail companies established in 2013
Retail companies of England
Retail companies based in London
Companies based in London
3D printing
Internet properties established in 2013
2013 establishments in England